, also known as Samurai Town: Story 1, Story 2 and Story 3, are respectively 1928 and 1929 black and white Japanese silent films directed by Masahiro Makino. Serving as parts of a 4-part series, the first and second installments are representative films of Masahiro Makino, the son of Shozo Makino (considered the 'father of Japanese film'). The Story 2 consists of two parts - the "first chapter" and "the solution".

These films lent status to ensemble casts and did not rely on famous stars. The film was known for its depiction of the unique setting of the ronin town as well as for the exquisite camera work and fast-paced sword fighting scenes.

Most of the film of Story 1 was lost, and Story 3 was completely lost. The shortened version of the film of Story 2 exists.

Makino remade this movie in 1939, 1951, 1957, 1990.

External links
 
 
 
 

1928 films
Japanese black-and-white films
Japanese silent films